Vahur Karus is an Estonian military personnel.

Since 1993 he has worked for Estonian Defence Forces. From 2006 to 2007 he was the commander of  the Estonian Contingency in Afghanistan. He has been the commander of the Scouts Battalion. Since 2018 he is the commander of 1st Infantry Brigade.

References

Living people
Year of birth missing (living people)
Estonian brigadier generals